Queensbury School may refer to:

 Queensbury High School, New York City, New York, US
 Queensbury Elementary School, in School District 44 North Vancouver, British Columbia, Canada
 Queensbury School (West Yorkshire), England, UK; a secondary school in Queensbury
 Queensbury Academy, Dunstable, Bedfordshire, England, UK; formerly Queensbury Upper School
 Queensbury School, Erdington, a school in Birmingham, West Midlands, England, UK

See also
 Queensbury Academy (disambiguation)
 Queensbury (disambiguation)